Albert Arthur "Alf" Purcell (3 November 1872, Hoxton – 24 December 1935) was a British trade unionist and Labour Party politician. He was a founding member of the Communist Party of Great Britain and later  President of the International Federation of Trade Unions from 1924 to 1928  and sat in the House of Commons during two separate periods between 1923 and 1929.

Early life
The son of a French polisher, Purcell lived in East London until he moved with his family to Yorkshire at an early age. He was educated at elementary school in Keighley but at the age of nine started work part-time in a local woolen mill. The family returned to Hoxton in 1890, and he was a taken on as an apprentice French polisher. He joined the London French Polishers' Union in 1891. In 1893, he joined the  Legal Eight Hours and International Labour League. By 1898, he was its general secretary. It was later incorporated into the National Amalgamated Furnishing Trades Association. About the same time, he also joined the South Salford Branch of the Social Democratic Federation.

Political career
In 1907, he was elected to Salford Borough Council, serving for six years. In 1911, he became the assistant general secretary of the union, and in 1917, he was elected as its general secretary. He also served as treasurer of the Federation of Engineering and Shipbuilding Trades for three years and then as president. 

He attended the Foundation Congress of the Communist Party of Great Britain and was responsible for the resolution proposing the foundation of the Communist Party of Great Britain.

In 1920, he visited Belfast as part of a Trades Union Congress delegation enquiring into the workplace expulsions. He was elected to the General Council of the  TUC in 1921 and became President of the TUC in 1924. In 1925, he chaired a TUC delegation to the Soviet Union. Leon Trotsky was very critical of the political choices of the Stalinist bureaucracy toward Purcell.

At the December 1923 general election, Purcell was elected as the Member of Parliament (MP) for Coventry by defeating the sitting Conservative MP, Sir Edward Manville. However, at the October 1924 general election, he was defeated by Manville.

Purcell was out of Parliament for only nine months. James Wignall, the Labour MP for the Forest of Dean division of Gloucestershire, died in June 1925, and at the resulting by-election on 14 July, Purcell won the seat. He did not defend that seat at the 1929 general election and stood instead in Manchester Moss Side. He lost to the sitting Conservative MP, Sir Gerald Berkeley Hurst.

References

External links 
 

1872 births
1935 deaths
Labour Party (UK) MPs for English constituencies
Members of the Parliamentary Committee of the Trades Union Congress
UK MPs 1923–1924
UK MPs 1924–1929
British trade unionists
Presidents of the Trades Union Congress
English communists